Clay Davidson (born April 4, 1971) is an American country music artist. He signed to Virgin Records' Nashville division in late 1999. Davidson released his debut album Unconditional on April 11, 2000. Its title track was a top 5 hit for him on the Billboard country charts, and the album produced two more Top 30 hits. Davidson was later transferred to Capitol Records Nashville after Virgin Nashville's lineup was merged into Capitol, although he did not record anything for Capitol and was soon dropped. To date, Unconditional remains his only studio album.

Biography
Clay Davidson was born in Saltville, Virginia to a musical family. He moved to Nashville, Tennessee in search of a record deal. While in Nashville, Davidson won Charlie Daniels' Talent Round-Up show in 1995. Davidson and his wife later moved to Tennessee, and Davidson soon became a demo singer for other artists.

Davidson was later called in to substitute for Michael McDonald at a party for rock artist Jude Cole. While at the party, Cole recommended Davidson to Scott Hendricks, who had just started the Virgin Records Nashville label. Davidson's first album, Unconditional, was released in 2000, producing three hit singles on the country music charts.

In early 2001, Virgin Records announced that it would be closing its Virgin Nashville branch. Virgin's artist roster was transferred to Capitol Nashville. Davidson, however, did not record any albums or singles during his tenure on Capitol. On July 20, 2001, Davidson and his touring band were involved in a bus accident outside Effingham, Illinois. He and his bandmates suffered only minor cuts and bruises, but several concerts had to be canceled.

Discography

Albums

Singles

Notes
A^ "Unconditional" also peaked at number 9 on the RPM Country Tracks chart in Canada.

Music videos

References

1971 births
Living people
American country singer-songwriters
Singer-songwriters from Virginia
People from Saltville, Virginia
Virgin Records artists
Country musicians from Virginia
21st-century American singers